Morpheis strigillata is a moth in the family Cossidae. It was described by Felder in 1874. It is found in Argentina.

References

Natural History Museum Lepidoptera generic names catalog

Zeuzerinae
Moths described in 1874